Veena Bharti is an Indian politician from Bihar and a Member of the Bihar Legislative Assembly. Bharti won the Triveniganj Assembly constituency on the JD(U) ticket in the 2020 Bihar Legislative Assembly election.

References

Living people
Bihar MLAs 2020–2025
Janata Dal (United) politicians
Year of birth missing (living people)